Meigneux is the name of two communes in France:

 Meigneux, in the Seine-et-Marne département
 Meigneux, in the Somme département